The locomotives of the German DRG Class 81 were standard (Einheitsdampflokomotiven) goods train tank locomotives with the Deutsche Reichsbahn-Gesellschaft (DRG).

In 1928, ten examples were delivered by the firm of Hanomag that matched the Class 80 locomotives in many details. The axles were all fixed rigidly to the frame, but the middle one had thinner wheel flanges. In contrast to the Class 80s, the Class 81 engines had a larger heating area and carried more coal and water. The delivery of 60 more vehicles was cancelled in 1940 due to the Second World War. The locomotives were mainly employed on heavy shunting duties. After their collection, the ten engines were allocated to the locomotive depots (Bahnbetriebswerken or Bw) of Goslar (81 001–005) and Oldenburg (81 006–010). In 1945 all the engines were in the Oldenburg area and went over to the Deutsche Bundesbahn.  The last engine was taken out of service in October 1963. Number 81 005 was still working as an industrial loco in AW Nied after its retirement from the DB.

Preserved locomotives 
Number 81 004 is the only one of its type to have been preserved. After passing through several owners and locations, it has found a home with the Hessencourrier society, who intend to have it refurbished.

See also
 List of DRG locomotives and railbuses

References

81
0-8-0T locomotives
81
Railway locomotives introduced in 1928
Hanomag locomotives
Standard gauge locomotives of Germany
D h2t locomotives
Freight locomotives